Université FC are a football club based in Ngaoundéré, Cameroon.

Current squad

Football clubs in Cameroon
Sports clubs in Cameroon